Kneževo, formerly Skender Vakuf, is a town and municipality located in northwestern Bosnia and Herzegovina. Administratively, it is a part of the Republika Srpska entity. As of 2013, it has a population of 9,793 inhabitants.

Name
Up until the 1992-1995 Bosnian War, the town was known as Skender Vakuf. During the war, the town was renamed Kneževo by the Serb authorities as part of their ethnic cleansing policies. Accordingly, many media outlets in the region continue to refer to the area as Skender Vakuf-Kneževo.

History

Roman basilica have been found in Imljani and Javorani, and remains of the Roman road from Servitium (Banja Luka) to Levsaba (Travnik) were also found in the vicinity. Tombstones of the Stećak type date back to the 14th and 15th centuries, when the area was part of the Kingdom of Bosnia. The town was founded in the Ottoman Empire. It is first mentioned in the records of a Muslim judge from Jajce in 1693, while there is no record of it in the census of the Bosnia Eyalet of 1604. Two generations of imams are mentioned in the records, which means it was most likely founded in the latter half of the 17th century. The architecture of the Old Mosque in Skender-Vakuf also indicates it was built in the latter half of the 17th century. The charitable endowment (vakuf) that is reflected in the town's traditional name Skender Vakuf (after Ali-dedo Skender) contributed to urbanization. The Old Mosque was significant and one of the first in the region. It was destroyed, along with the New Mosque, in 1992 during the Bosnian War.

In the Korićani Cliffs massacre of 21 August 1992, some 200 Bosniaks and Croats detainees were massacred by the Bosnian Serbs Police and Army forces from Prijedor (in deep cliff in the canyon of Ilomska) river.

After the Bosnian War, part of the municipality was split off to form the Dobretići municipality of the Federation of Bosnia and Herzegovina entity.

Geography

Kneževo is located between the rivers Ugar, Vrbas and Vrbanja and surrounded by the mountain chains of Čemernica, Ranča in the west, Vlašić in the south and Ježica in the north-east.

Neighbouring municipalities are Čelinac (extreme north), Kotor Varoš (east), Travnik, Dobretići, Jajce (south), Mrkonjić Grad and the city of Banja Luka (west). The southern border is defined by the border of the Republika Srpska with the Federation of Bosnia and Herzegovina, the country's other entity.

Settlements
Aside from the town of Kneževo, the municipality includes the following settlements:

 Bastaji
 Bekići
 Bokani
 Borak
 Bregovi
 Vlatkovići
 Golo Brdo
 Gornji Korićani
 Doline
 Donji Korićani
 Živinice
 Imljani
Imamovići
 Javorani
 Kobilja
 Korićani
 Kostići
Mušanovići
 Milovići
 Mokri Lug
 Pavlovići
 Paunovići
 Petrovo Polje
 Ravni Sto
 Rađići
 Ćeleši
 Ćukovac
 Čarići
 Šolaji

Demographics

Population

Ethnic composition

After the war, the majority of the old Skender Vakuf municipality became part of the new Kneževo municipality of the Republika Srpska entity. Four Croatian pre-war settlements became part of the new Dobretići municipality of the Federation of Bosnia and Herzegovina entity.

Culture

The municipality houses several cultural monuments, such as the Old Church of St. Nicholas from 1757, the 18th-century Church of Prophet Elijah.

In Imljani there is a monument dedicated to 43 fallen soldiers of the Army of Republika Srpska who fell at the Vlašić battlefield on 20 March 1995.

Politics
The mayor of Knezevo is Bore Škeljić, of the Serb Democratic Party (SDS).

Notable people

Radojka Lakić, National Hero of Yugoslavia
Luka Radetić, National Hero of Yugoslavia
Dujko Komljenović, National Hero of Yugoslavia
Lazar Tešanović, Chetnik officer, born in Javorani
Željko Raljić, journalist
Momir Ćelić, professor
Tihomir Radetić, film director
Levon Keleman, software engineer

Annotations
According to the 1991 census, the municipality consisted of: Bastaji, Bokani, Borak, Bregovi, Brnjići, Bunar, Čarići, Ćukovac, Davidovići, Dobratići, Donji Orašac, Golo Brdo, Gornji Orašac, Imljani, Javorani, Kobilja, Kostići, Kričići - Jejići, Melina, Mijatovići, Milaševci, Mokri Lug, Paunovići, Pavlovići, Prisika, Rađići, Skender Vakuf, Slipčevići, Šolaji, Vitovlje Malo, Vlatkovići, Vukovići, Zapeće, Zasavica, Zubovići and Živinice.

In 1995, the municipality included Bastaji, Bokani, Borak, Bregovi, Čarići, Ćukovac, Golo Brdo, Imljani, Javorani, Kobilja, Kostići, Malići, Mokri Lug, Paunovići, Rađići, Kneževo, Šolaji, Vlatkovići and Živinice; the south-western settlements of Davidovići, Dobretići, Kričići and Melina became part of the municipality of Dobretići in the Federation of Bosnia and Herzegovina.

References

External links

 Official Municipality Website

 
Cities and towns in Republika Srpska